Montrose Dujon Phinn (born 25 November 1987) is a Jamaican international footballer who plays for Harbour View, as a defender.

Career
Phinn has played club football for Harbour View.

He made his international debut for Jamaica in 2011.

References

1987 births
Living people
Jamaican footballers
Jamaica international footballers
Harbour View F.C. players
Association football defenders
National Premier League players